Vincenzo Paglia (born 20 April 1945) is an Italian prelate of the Catholic Church. He is the president of the Pontifical Academy for Life and grand chancellor of the John Paul II Pontifical Theological Institute for Marriage and Family Sciences. 

Paglia was president of the Pontifical Council for the Family from 2012 to 2016 and Bishop of Terni-Narni-Amelia from 2000 to 2012. He was also a co-founder of the Community of Sant'Egidio in 1968. Paglia was the postulator for the cause of canonization of Óscar Romero and of Felix Varela.

Early years
Paglia was born in Boville Ernica, Frosinone, Italy. He was educated at the Pontifical Roman Minor and Major Seminary. He earned a Licentiate in Philosophy and a degree in Theology from the Pontifical Lateran University, Rome. He also earned a master's degree in Pedagogy from the University of Urbino, Italy. As a student in 1968, he was one of the co-founders of the Community of Sant'Egidio, an association of lay Catholics.

He was ordained a priest for the diocese of Rome on 15 March 1970 and served as a curate in Casal Palocco from 1970 to 1973. Later, he was rector of the Church of Sant'Egidio in Trastevere. From 1981 to 2000, he was the pastor of the Basilica parish of Santa Maria in Trastevere. There in 1982, he initiated the annual Christmas lunch (Pranzo di Natale) for the homeless and the poor, a project of the Community of Sant'Egidio held inside the church.

He was the first priest to enter Albania after the elections in March and April 1991. He successfully negotiated the re-opening of the seminary and the return of the cathedral, and he paved the way for relations between Albania and the Holy See.

On 4 March 2000, Pope John Paul II appointed him bishop of Terni-Narni-Amelia. He received episcopal consecration from Cardinal Camillo Ruini on 2 April and took possession of the diocese on 16 April.

In September 2002, John Paul named him President of the Catholic Biblical Federation.

From 2004 to 2009, he was chairman of the Commission for Ecumenism and Dialogue of the Italian Episcopal Conference, and from 2009 until 2012 he was president of the Episcopal Conference of Umbria. As President of the Conference of Bishops of Umbria, he promoted the Solidarity Fund, an initiative that provides economic support for families particularly affected by the recent economic crisis.

He was ecclesiastical advisor of the Community of Sant'Egidio.

In December 2010, the town of Narnia sold a castle to an Italian investment group whose head was also a financial officer of Paglia's diocese. A government investigation into the transaction found Paglia had not been involved.

On 6 January 2011, he was named one of the first members, for a five-year renewable term, of the Pontifical Council for Promoting the New Evangelization.

He has been responsible for inter-religious dialogue and has opposed a cooling of relations with Jewish leaders.
He was also the postulator of the cause of beatification of Mgr. Oscar Romero and wore his pectoral cross that had been donated to Paglia by Mgr. Ricardo Urioste, the Romero's auxiliary bishop.

Pontifical Council for the Family
On 26 June 2012, Pope Benedict XVI named him President of the Pontifical Council for the Family and raised him to the rank of archbishop.

In February 2013, he noted in an interview that homosexual couples should be safe from unjust discrimination in countries where homosexual acts are illegal. He later said that he was not suggesting a change in church doctrine and that he was restating the official teaching of the Church.

As the President of the Pontifical Council for the Family, he was responsible for the Church's triennial World Meeting of Families.

His tenure as head of the Pontifical Council on the Family ended when that department's functions were taken over by the new Dicastery for the Laity, Family and Life on 1 September 2016.

Pontifical Academy for Life
On 15 August 2016, Pope Francis named him President of the Pontifical Academy for Life and Grand Chancellor of the Pontifical John Paul II Institute for Studies on Marriage and Family, later renamed the John Paul II Pontifical Theological Institute for Marriage and Family Sciences. His appointment was part of Pope Francis' reform of the Roman Curia, timed to coincide with the erection of the Dicastery for the Laity, Family and Life. Francis gave the Institute greater autonomy by setting aside the Institute's statute that made the grand chancellor of the Pontifical Lateran University its grand chancellor as well, anticipating his revision of the Institute's statues released in September 2017. He authored a mission statement urging Paglia to "aid families to live their vocation in today's world" by promoting "the perspective of mercy", knowing that "even in theological study, the pastoral perspective and attention to the wounds of humanity never fail".

On 19 September 2016, he presided and delivered the homily at the funeral of former Italian President Carlo Azeglio Ciampi. A longtime friend of Ciampi, he described bringing Pope Francis' blessing to him on his deathbed.

References

External links
 
 
 

1945 births
Living people
21st-century Italian Roman Catholic bishops
People from Frosinone
Pontifical Lateran University alumni
Pontifical Roman Seminary alumni
Members of the Pontifical Council for the Promotion of the New Evangelisation
Pontifical Academy for Life
Officials of the Roman Curia